Edward William Max Peltz (16 December 1916 – 1969) was a South African boxer who competed in the 1936 Summer Olympics.

In 1936 he was eliminated in the first round of the middleweight class after losing his fight to the upcoming silver medalist Henry Tiller.

External links
Edward Peltz's profile at Sports Reference.com

1916 births
1969 deaths
Middleweight boxers
Olympic boxers of South Africa
Boxers at the 1936 Summer Olympics
South African male boxers